Methyl butyrate, also known under the systematic name methyl butanoate, is the methyl ester of butyric acid. Like most esters, it has a fruity odor, in this case resembling apples or pineapples. At room temperature, it is a colorless liquid with low solubility in water, upon which it floats to form an oily layer. Although it is flammable, it has a relatively low vapor pressure (40 mmHg at ), so it can be safely handled at room temperature without special safety precautions.

Methyl butyrate is present in small amounts in several plant products, especially pineapple oil. It can be produced by distillation from essential oils of vegetable origin, but is also manufactured on a small scale for use in perfumes and as a food flavoring.

Methyl butyrate has been used in combustion studies as a surrogate fuel for the larger fatty acid methyl esters found in biodiesel. However, studies have shown that, due to its short-chain length, methyl butyrate does not reproduce well the negative temperature coefficient (NTC) behaviour  and early CO2 formation characteristics of real biodiesel fuels.  Therefore, methyl butyrate is not a suitable surrogate fuel for biodiesel combustion studies.

References

Methyl esters
Butyrate esters
Perfume ingredients
Flavors